Lindheim is a surname. Notable people with the surname include:

 (1790–1860), German merchant 
Irma Lindheim (1886–1978), Zionist fundraiser and educator
Mary Tuthill Lindheim (1912–2004), American sculptor and studio potter
Nicholas Lindheim (born 1984), American golfer

See also
Lindheim Castle